Long Wharf is a historic American pier in Boston, Massachusetts, built between 1710 and 1721. It once extended from State Street nearly a half-mile into Boston Harbor; today, the much-shortened wharf (due to land fill on the city end) functions as a dock for passenger ferries and sightseeing boats.

History

18th century
Construction of the wharf began around 1710. As originally built the wharf extended from the shoreline adjacent to Faneuil Hall and was one-third of a mile long, thrusting considerably farther than other wharves into deep water and thus allowing larger ships to tie up and unload directly to new warehouses and stores. "Constructed by Captain Oliver Noyes, it was lined with warehouses and served as the focus of Boston's great harbor." Over time the water areas surrounding the landward end of the wharf were reclaimed, including the areas now occupied by Quincy Market and the Customs House.

"At the wharf's head in the 18th century was the Bunch-of-Grapes Tavern. The painter John Singleton Copley spent his childhood on the wharf, where his mother had a tobacco shop." The 1760s Gardiner Building, once home to John Hancock's counting house and now a Chart House restaurant, is the wharf's oldest surviving structure.

19th century

Among several similar structures, a grand granite warehouse known as the Custom House Block was built in 1848 atop the wharf; it has survived into the 21st century. The mid-19th century was the height of Boston's importance as a shipping center, lasting roughly until the American Civil War. Long Wharf was the central focus of much of this economic activity.

In the late 1860s, as the city's port began to decline in importance as an international shipping destination, Atlantic Avenue was cut through this and other wharves, changing the face of the waterfront.

20th century
The construction of the elevated Central Artery along Atlantic Avenue in the 1950s separated Long Wharf from Boston's business district.

The wharf and the 19th-century Custom House Block were recognized as a National Historic Landmark in recognition for the role they played in the history of Boston and its importance as a major 19th-century shipping center.

21st century

The Big Dig put the Central Artery below ground level, which partially restored the original close relationship between Long Wharf and downtown. Since ca.1990, Long Wharf has been transformed from a failing commercial waterfront area into a recreational and cultural center.

Today, Long Wharf is adjacent to the New England Aquarium, and is served by the Aquarium station on MBTA's Blue Line subway. MBTA boat services link the wharf to the Boston Navy Yard in Charlestown, Logan International Airport, Hull, and Quincy. Other passenger ferry services operate to the islands of the Boston Harbor Islands National Recreation Area, and to the cities of Salem and Provincetown. Cruise boats operate various cruises around the harbour. The wharf itself is occupied by a hotel, several restaurants and shops. At the seaward end, there is a large plaza with extensive views of the harbor. Now much shortened by land reclamation at its landward end, today it serves as the principal terminus for cruise boats and harbor ferries operating on Boston Harbor.

Custom House Block
The Custom House Block, built in 1845-87 in Boston, Massachusetts, is a former warehouse on Long Wharf, at the end of State Street. Architect Isaiah Rogers designed the four-storey building, constructed of granite and brick. In its 19th-century heyday, it contributed to the life of "Boston's busiest pier, commercial port, and embarkation point for travelers." Today private owners maintain the site.

The building was renovated in 1973 by Anderson, Notter, Feingold.

Gardiner Building

The Gardiner Building, located on Long Wharf, is a brick Colonial style warehouse built in 1763 and rebuilt in 1812.  At one time it was used as John Hancock's counting house.  Long Wharf was once filled with this kind of building, but this is the only one remaining; it is the wharf's oldest surviving structure. The building was renovated in 1973 by Anderson, Notter, Feingold.  It is currently a Chart House seafood restaurant.

The Gardiner Building features a slate roof and "six-over-six" windows with shutters.  The lintels and sills are granite.

Services
The following marine services operate from the Long Wharf:
 MBTA Boat (north side)
 Ferries to the Boston Harbor Islands National Recreation Area (north side)
 Ferry to Salem, Massachusetts (north side)
 Ferry to Provincetown, Massachusetts
 Water taxi
 New England Aquarium harbor tours (south side) – Aquarium itself is on Central Wharf to the immediate south
 Various harbor cruises
 Docks for private vessels

See also
 Custom House District, area near Long Wharf
 Boston Custom House, built 1849 on State Street
 State Street Block (Boston), built 1857 on State Street
 National Register of Historic Places listings in northern Boston, Massachusetts
 List of National Historic Landmarks in Boston

References

External links

 Google news archive. Articles about Long Wharf.
 Harvard Business School. Proprietors of the Boston Pier, or Long Wharf records, 1762-1903

1710 establishments in Massachusetts
Boston Harbor
Landmarks in Financial District, Boston
Wharves in Boston
Redeveloped ports and waterfronts in the United States
Industrial buildings and structures on the National Register of Historic Places in Massachusetts
History of Boston
National Historic Landmarks in Boston
Wharves on the National Register of Historic Places
Transportation buildings and structures on the National Register of Historic Places in Massachusetts
National Register of Historic Places in Boston
Buildings and structures completed in 1710